Stenning may refer to:

 Alison Stenning, British geographer and academic 
 Emma Stenning (born 1975), British arts professional
 Ernest Stenning (1885–1964), English Anglican priest
 Henry Stenning (1889–1971), English socialist and translator 
 John Stenning (1868–1959), English Semiticist, academic, and British Army officer
 Keith Stenning, British cognitive scientist
 Paul Stenning (born 1976), English author, poet, interviewer, and ghostwriter
 Stephen Stenning, Scottish arts director